John Xintavelonis (also known as John X) is a Tasmanian actor and comedian, known in Australia for his performance as Pumbaa the warthog in the Australian production of the stage musical, The Lion King.

Career
John played Mr. Braithwaite in Billy Elliot the Musical in Sydney and Melbourne.

References

External links

Living people
Australian male film actors
Australian male stage actors
Australian male television actors
Australian male comedians
Year of birth missing (living people)